Roßbach is a municipality in the district of Braunau am Inn in the Austrian state of Upper Austria.

Geography
Roßbach lies in the Innviertel. About 30 percent of the municipality is forest and 64 percent farmland.

References

Cities and towns in Braunau am Inn District